The Hamgyeong Line was a railway line of the Chosen Government Railway (Sentetsu) in Japanese-occupied Korea, running from Wonsan to Sangsambong. Construction began in 1914, and was completed in 1928. The line is now entirely within North Korea; the Korean State Railway has divided it between the Kangwŏn Line (Wonsan−Kowon section), the P'yŏngra Line (Kowon−Cheongjin section), the Kangdŏk Line (Namgangdŏk−Suseong), and the Hambuk Line (Chongjin−Sangsambong section).

History 

Sentetsu began construction of a line north from Wonsan on the Gyeongwon Line on 1 October 1914. The first section, a  line from Wonsan to Muncheon, was completed on 1 August 1915, followed by a  extension from Muncheon to Yeongheung via Gowon on 21 July 1916. At the same time, Sentetsu started construction of a line north from the important east coast port of Cheongjin, completing the first  section from Cheongjin to Changpyeong, on 5 November 1916.

On 31 July 1917, the management of Sentetsu was transferred from the Railway Bureau of the Government-General of Korea to the South Manchuria Railway (Mantetsu), which established the Mantetsu Gyeongseong Railway Administration (Japanese: 満鉄京城管理局, Mantetsu Keijō Kanrikyoku; Korean: 만철 경성 관리국, Mancheol Gyeongseong Gwalliguk) to oversee the operation of all railways in Korea.

To handle increasing freight traffic on the line, a large marshalling yard, called Cheongjin Jochajang, was built near Cheongjin. Construction of the southern portion of the Hamgyeong Line continued at the same time, with a new  section from Yeongheung to Hamheung being opened on 15 December 1919.

On 1 April 1925, management of Korea's railways was returned to the Railway Bureau, and Sentetsu became independent of Mantetsu once again.

The final  gap between Geosan and Gunseon was closed on 1 September 1928, completing the line in its entirety from Wonsan to Hoeryeong. At the same time, the line was split, with the Wonsan−Cheongjin section being named the Hamgyeong Main Line, and the Cheongjin−Hoeryeong section becoming the Cheongjin Line. These lines later played a major role in the Japanese invasion of Manchuria, and grew further in importance after the establishment of the puppet state of Manchukuo.

The privately owned Domun Railway was formed in 1920, opening its first line, from Hoeryeong to Sangsambong on 5 January 1920. This line was subsequently extended twice, from Sangsambong to Jongseon on 1 December 1922, and from  Jongseon to Donggwanjin on 1 November 1924.

In order to create the shortest possible route from Japan to eastern Manchuria, Sentetsu began construction of a line from Unggi (now Sŏnbong) to Donggwanjin via Namyang in 1929. Named the East Domun Line, it reached Donggwanjin on 1 August 1933, at which time the entire Hoeryeong−Unggi line was redesignated as the Domun Line, and Donggwanjin Station was renamed to Donggwan Station.

On 1 April 1929, the Domun Railway was nationalised, with the mainline becoming Sentetsu's West Domun Line, after which the Manchukuo National bought the Tiantu Railway, converting it to standard gauge and opening the new line, called Chaokai Line, at the end of March 1934, creating a second direct connection across the Tumen River between Korea and Manchukuo.

Just a few months after completion of the line from Unggi, on 1 October 1933 the management of Sentetsu's entire route from Cheongjin to Unggi was transferred to Mantetsu,. On 1 November 1934, Mantetsu rearranged these lines, merging the Namyang Border Line with the Unggi−Namyang section of the Domun Line to create the North Chosen East Line (Unggi–Namyang–Tumen), with the Namyang–Sambong section becoming the North Chosen West Line. In 1936, the "Asahi" express train between Xinjing and Najin was inaugurated, to connect to the ferry from Najin to Japan.

In 1940, management of the Cheongjin–Sangsambong route was transferred back to Sentetsu, merging it with the Wonsan−Cheongjin Hamgyeong Main Line to create the Hamgyeong Line; Mantetsu continued to manage the North Chosen Line, eventually acquiring outright ownership of the line.

On 1 December 1941, a new line was opened between Nanam and Cheongjin to allow trains to bypass the Cheongjin marshalling yard. The existing line, running via Gangdeok Station and the marshalling yard, was detached from the Hamgyeong Line and designated the Gangdeok Line; at the same time, a  connection from Cheongjin Seohang Station (Cheongjin West Port) to Gangdeok was built, to allow southbound trains to access the marshalling yard without having to reverse at Nanam.

Service on the line was suspended after the Soviet invasion at the end of the Pacific War. The damage sustained by the line during the war was slow to be repaired due to strained relations between the Soviets and the Korean People's Committees; those two bridges have not been repaired to the present day. After the partition of Korea, the Provisional People’s Committee for North Korea nationalised all railways in the Soviet zone of occupation on 10 August 1946, and following the establishment of the DPRK, the Korean State Railway was created in 1948. After the end of the Korean War, the North Korean railway system was restructured, which included the rearrangement of several rail lines. This included the division of the Hamgyeong Line into three parts.

The Cheongjin−Hoeryeong–Sambong (formerly Sangsambong) section of the Hamgyeong Line inherited from Sentetsu was merged with the former Sambong−Namyang North Chosen West Line, the Namyang−Unggi section of the North Chosen East Line, and the Unggi−Najin Ungna Line inherited from Mantetsu to create the new Hambuk Line running from Cheongjin to Najin via Namyang. The Namyang−Tumen cross-border section of the North Chosen East Line was split off to create the Namyang Gukgyeong Line.

The Gowon−Geumya (formerly Yeongheung) section of the Hamgyeong Line was merged with the Pyeongyang−Gowon Pyeongwon Line and the partially completed Cheongjin−Rajin Cheongna Line to create the P'yŏngra Line from Pyeongyang to Najin.

The partition of Korea left the Pyeonggang−Wonsan section of Sentetsu's Gyeongwon Line in the DPRK; this was then merged with the Wonsan−Gowon section of the former Hamgyeong line to create the Pyeonggang−Wonsan−Gowon Kangwŏn Line.

Route

References

Railway lines in Korea
Sentetsu railway lines
Mantetsu railway lines
Railway lines opened in 1915